Madis Mihkels (born 31 May 2003) is an Estonian racing cyclist, who currently rides for UCI WorldTeam . In 2023, he joined  as a regular rider on a two-year contract after spending the late part of the 2022 season with the team as a stagiaire.

Major results

Road

2020
 National Junior Road Championships
2nd Road race
2nd Time trial
2021
 National Junior Road Championships
1st  Road race
1st  Time trial
 3rd  Road race, UCI Junior Road World Championships
 3rd Overall One Belt One Road Nation's Cup Hungary
1st Stages 1a & 1b
 7th Road race, UEC European Junior Road Championships
2022
 4th Overall Tour of Estonia
1st  Young rider classification
1st Stage 1
 4th Road race, UCI Road World Under-23 Championships
 5th Grand Prix de la Somme
 6th Overall Tour du Loir et Cher
 6th Gran Piemonte

Cyclo-cross
2019–2020
 1st  National Junior Championships
2020–2021
 1st  National Junior Championships
2021–2022
 2nd National Under-23 Championships
2022–2023
 1st Bike Fanatics Keila CX

References

External links
 

2003 births
Living people
Estonian male cyclists
Sportspeople from Tartu